The Bugeac Steppe, Budjak Steppe or Budzhak Steppe is a steppe located in the south of Ukraine and Moldova from the Dniester to Prut rivers reaching down to the Black Sea. The Bugeac Steppe has a total surface of 3,210 km2, of which 6.1% is forest.

See also
 Budjak

References

Grasslands of Moldova
Grasslands of Ukraine